Sunghoo Park is a South Korean anime director and animator based in Japan. He is best known for directing the 2020 anime series Jujutsu Kaisen and The God of High School.

Biography
Park decided to enter the anime industry after he watched film Macross: Do You Remember Love? as well as its anime series. He first studied at a university in South Korea that has an animation department, but he moved

In 2004, he joined Studio Comet, working on series such as Onegai My Melody. In 2017, under MAPPA, he made his directorial debut with Garo: Vanishing Line.

He also worked on the opening sequence for Zombieland Saga, and became the assistant director for Banana Fish. In 2020, he directed The God of High School, a South Korean webcomic adaptation. Later that year, he directed Jujutsu Kaisen, which won Best Anime at the 5th Crunchyroll Anime Awards. Park himself was also nominated for Best Director at the same awards. In December 2021, Park directed the film prequel, Jujutsu Kaisen 0. Park wanted to make each character's facial expression carefully to give them a proper look when fighting. He considers the new protagonist, Yuta Okkotsu, as a straightforward teenager whom he aimed to show his loneliness caused by being chased by Rika's Curse. Megumi Ogata surprised Park in the making of the movie for giving Yuta a sensitive characterization when crying. Park added elements of Chinese movies to the feature which he wanted fans to look forward. He also praised Seko's script for the movie which is meant to show Okkotsu's transformation into a hero. While the television series was noted for having entertaining fight scenes, MAPPA aimed to make the film cooler. In 2022, the second cour of Jujutsu Kaisen was nominated for anime of the year. Park was also once again nominated for best director.

Works

TV series
 Terror in Resonance (2014) (key animator)
 Yuri!!! on Ice (2016) (key animator)
 Garo: Vanishing Line (2017–2018) (director)
 Banana Fish (2018) (assistant episode director) (ep 13)
 The God of High School (2020) (director)
 Jujutsu Kaisen (2020–2021) (director)
 Ninja Kamui (TBA) (director)

ONA
Project Bullet/Bullet (TBA) (original story draft)

Films
 Jujutsu Kaisen 0 (2021) (director)

References

External links
 

Anime directors
Living people
South Korean animated film directors
South Korean television directors
Year of birth missing (living people)